Patrick Thomas Weir (born 25 February 1960) is an Australian politician. He has been the Liberal National Party member for Condamine in the Queensland Legislative Assembly since 2015.

References

1960 births
Living people
Members of the Queensland Legislative Assembly
Liberal National Party of Queensland politicians
21st-century Australian politicians